Sainte-Catherine station is a commuter rail station operated by Exo in Saint-Constant, Quebec, Canada. It is served by  the Candiac line.

Local transit connections 
 CIT Roussillon route 33

References

External links
 Sainte-Catherine Commuter Train Station Information (RTM)
 Du Canal Commuter Train Station Schedule (RTM)

Exo commuter rail stations
Railway stations in Montérégie
Railway stations in Canada opened in 2001
Saint-Constant, Quebec
2001 establishments in Quebec
Rail transport in Roussillon Regional County Municipality